Montague Elementary School may refer to:
 Montague Elementary School - Montague, Texas - Montague Independent School District
 Montague Township Elementary School - Montague Township, New Jersey - Montague Township School District

See also
 Montague Village Elementary School - Fort Hood, Texas - Killeen Independent School District
 Montague Consolidated School - Montague, Prince Edward Island - Public Schools Branch (formerly in the Eastern School District)